Miland Station is an abandoned railway station on the Rjukan Line at Miland in Tinn, Norway. It was in use from 1909 to 1970 by Norsk Transport.

History
The station opened as a stop on August 9, 1909, received cargo expedition on May 1, 1917 while the station building opened in January 1919, after World War I had delayed the building. After the steamship operations on Lake Tinn terminated in the 1930s the traffic to the station increased, since all cargo and passengers had to use the railway. The station served a rural area with up to eleven general stores, hotels and a tourist industry.

The station became unmanned in 1969 and was closed on May 31, 1970 when passenger transport on the Rjukan Line terminated. It was sold as a residence in 1985, but torn down in 1989 as part of the new Route 37 highway.

Notes

References

External links
 Norsk Jernbaneklubb entry 

Railway stations on the Rjukan Line
Railway stations in Tinn
Railway stations opened in 1909
Railway stations closed in 1970
Disused railway stations in Norway
1909 establishments in Norway
1970 disestablishments in Norway